Orlando Vega Smith (born June 16, 1968) is a retired basketball player from Puerto Rico.

High School Basketball
A 6' 4" Shooting guard/Small forward, Vega played for  Oak Hill Academy, finishing the 1987–88 season with an average of 30.6 ppg, the highest single season scoring average in school history. Vega's highlights during that season included scoring 48 points against New Hampton School. For his performance that year, Vega was named the school's MVP. Also, during the 1988 Dapper Dan Roundball Classic, one of the nation's premier showcases for high school basketball talent, Vega earned the MVP trophy, beating out teammates, and future notable NBA players Alonzo Mourning, Chris Jackson, Billy Owens and Shawn Kemp. The opposing squad featured LaPhonso Ellis and Anthony Peeler. After the 1987–88 season, Vega was recruited by The University of Arizona and later transferred to Providence but never played. Instead, he returned to Puerto Rico and became a star on the island's professional circuit.

National Superior Basketball League of Puerto Rico
In 1988 he made his debut on the National Superior Basketball League of Puerto Rico (BSN), playing for the Quebradillas Pirates. Vega quickly became an impact player, completing his rookie season with a respectable average of 18.7 ppg. Two seasons later, during the 1990 tournament he led the league in scoring, averaging 29.9 ppg along with 8.3 rpg while shooting 40% from three-point range. He played a total of 18 seasons in Puerto Rico with the Quebradillas Pirates,  Caguas Creoles, Ponce Lions, Isabela Fighting Cocks, and the Arecibo Captains, finishing with career averages of 19.6 ppg, 5.3 rpg and a 36% effectiveness in 3pt field goal attempts. Vega signed a free-agent contract with the L.A. Clippers during the 1994 preseason, but did not make the roster.

International career
He played in the 1994 and 1998 FIBA World Basketball Championship. He was also a member of the gold winning Puerto Rican National Basketball Team at the 1994 Goodwill Games held in Saint Petersburg, Russia. Vega won the bronze medal at the 1999 Pan American Games while also playing in the 1993 and 1998 Central American and Caribbean Games, the 1995(where the team won the gold medal) and 1999 FIBA Americas Championship, and in the 1995 and 1999 Pan American Games. Vega has played professionally in the Continental Basketball Association (CBA), Turkey, Venezuela, Cyprus and in Spain's Liga ACB, where he joined Caja Cantabria during the 1998 season, averaging 18.4 ppg.

References

1968 births
Living people
Baloncesto Superior Nacional players
Basketball players at the 1995 Pan American Games
Basketball players at the 1999 Pan American Games
Leones de Ponce basketball players
Parade High School All-Americans (boys' basketball)
Puerto Rican men's basketball players
Basketball players from New York City
Puerto Rico men's national basketball team players
Sportspeople from Brooklyn
Pan American Games bronze medalists for Puerto Rico
Pan American Games medalists in basketball
Piratas de Quebradillas players
Central American and Caribbean Games gold medalists for Puerto Rico
1998 FIBA World Championship players
Competitors at the 1993 Central American and Caribbean Games
Small forwards
Shooting guards
Goodwill Games medalists in basketball
Central American and Caribbean Games medalists in basketball
Competitors at the 1994 Goodwill Games
Medalists at the 1999 Pan American Games
Criollos de Caguas basketball players
1994 FIBA World Championship players